"Macarena" is a dance song by Spanish pop duo Los del Río, about a woman of the same name. The song uses a type of clave rhythm. Originally appearing on the 1993 album A mí me gusta, a subsequent remix by Miami-based producers The Bayside Boys became an international hit and inspired a dance craze in the latter half of 1996 and part of 1997. This version topped both the Billboard Hot 100 and the Cash Box Top 100 in the US. The song got the group ranked the " 1 Greatest One-Hit Wonder of All Time" by VH1 in 2002. In 2012, it was ranked No. 7 on Billboards All Time Top 100. It also ranked at No. 1 on Billboards All Time Latin Songs.

Composition
"Macarena"s composition features a variant on the clave rhythm. The song is written in the key of A♭ major, moves at a tempo of 103 beats per minute, and follows the repeated chord progression A♭–G♭ throughout.

Origin and history
As a result of their lounge act, Los del Río were invited to tour South America in 1992 and, while visiting Venezuela, they were invited to a private party held by the Venezuelan impresario Gustavo Cisneros. During the celebration, a local flamenco teacher, Diana Patricia Cubillán Herrera, performed a dance for the guests, and Los del Río were pleasantly surprised by Cubillán's dance skills. Spontaneously, Antonio Romero Monge, one half of the Los del Río duo, recited the song's chorus-to-be on the spot, as an accolade to Cubillán: "¡Diana, dale a tu cuerpo alegría y cosas buenas!'" ("Give your body some joy, Diana"). When Monge wrote the song, he changed the name to Macarena, in honor of Antonio's daughter Esperanza Macarena.

Spanish-language remix
In 1993, RCA Records released Macarena as a single in Spain along with two house remixes by Spanish group Fangoria, intended to popularize the song in nightclubs and discotheques. These remixes changed the flamenco rhythm of the song to an electronic beat. According to Alaska, member of Fangoria, the Bayside Boys remix that followed in 1996 took their version labelled "Macarena  (River F Remix)" as its base. The band denounced it as plagiarism on the Court of Justice of the European Union but the case did not go through.

English-language remix

In mid-1996, the song became a worldwide hit roughly one year after the Bayside Boys (composed of Mike Triay and Carlos de Yarza) produced a remix of the song that added English lyrics. Jammin Johnny Caride, a radio personality at Power 96 in Miami, first learned of the "Macarena" when clubgoers at a club where he worked as a DJ requested the song. Caride brought the "Macarena" to his supervisors at Power 96 who asked him to create an English-language version of the song.

Caride recruited his two partners at Bayside Records, Mike "In The Night" Triay and Carlos de Yarza, to remix the original song. The new, English-language lyrics were written by Carlos de Yarza. The Bayside Boys, Triay and de Yarza, added a new dance beat with English-language lyrics sung originally by a studio singer, then later during a concert tour by Carla Vanessa. Vanessa accepted a fixed-fee contract for her participation and live performances, and so does not receive any residual performer royalties. The finished version was called "Macarena (Bayside Boys Remix)." The Bayside Boys remix hit No. 1 on the Billboard Hot 100 in August 1996 and remained at the top of the chart for fourteen weeks. It also topped the US Cash Box Top 100.

Critical reception
Dan Glaister from The Guardian said that "Macarena" is imitating the successes of previous summer pop sensations, such as "Y Viva Espana", "Agadoo" and "Saturday Night". James Hamilton from Music Weeks RM Dance Update described the song as an "infectious cheerful girls giggled and guys chanted 'Me No Pop I'-ish original hit version of a jaunty hip wiggling dance craze huge for ages around Europe and now (breaking out of Florida) the US, in frisky flamenco clapped jiggling 103.2bpm Bayside Boys Mix". Peter Castro from People Magazine wrote, "The Achy Breaky Heart flatlined years ago and the Electric Slide is short-circuiting, so what's a dance-crazed world to do? The Macarena, obviously." Dave Fawbert from ShortList commented that "Macarena" is "a song that exists independently of cool, time, criticism – it's just there."

Popularity
The reworked "Macarena (Bayside Boys remix)" spent 14 weeks at No. 1 on the U.S. Billboard Hot 100 singles chart, becoming one of the longest runs atop the Hot 100 chart in history. The single spent its final week at No. 1 on its 46th week on the chart, recorded as the latest No. 1 single in Hot 100 history. Billboard ranked it as the No. 1 song for 1996. In the United Kingdom the song was released on 10 June 1996 and peaked at No. 2 on 17 August 1996, kept off the No. 1 spot by the huge popularity of the Spice Girls song "Wannabe." In Australia, it was the most successful song of 1996.

"Macarena" remained popular through 1996, but by the beginning of 1997, its popularity had begun to diminish. The song stayed in the Hot 100 chart for 60 weeks, the longest reign among No. 1 songs, only surpassed fifteen years later by Adele's "Rolling in the Deep". The Bayside Boys remix includes a sample from the Yazoo (also known in the United States as Yaz) track "Situation"—the laughter of Yazoo vocalist Alison Moyet. The chorus uses female vocal samples previously used by the Farm in their song "Higher and Higher (Remix)" from their album, Spartacus. The Bayside Boys toured the U.S. and the world and featured singer Carla Vanessa.

In the United States, the song, and its corresponding Macarena dance, became popular around the time of the 1996 Democratic National Convention in August of that year. C-SPAN filmed attendees dancing to the song in an afternoon session, a clip of which became popular on YouTube years later. Vice President Al Gore, having a reputation for stiffness, made a joke about doing the Macarena dance during his speech. He said, "I would like to demonstrate for you the Al Gore version of the Macarena," then remained motionless for a few seconds, and eventually asked, "Would you like to see it again?"

By 1997, the song had sold 11 million copies. While having only a 25% take in royalties from the song, Romero and Ruiz became immensely wealthy. According to BBC News, during the year 2003 alone—a full decade after the song's initial release—Romero and Ruiz made US$250,000 in royalties. Julio Iglesias is quoted as congratulating the duo personally: "My success singing in English from Miami is nothing compared to yours; coming out of Dos Hermanas with little international exposure elsewhere and selling these many records in Spanish takes two huge sets of cojones."

In VH1's 2002 documentary 100 Greatest One-hit Wonders, "Macarena" was ranked as No. 1. "Macarena" was also ranked No. 1 on a different VH1 documentary, 40 Awesomely Bad No. 1 Songs.

On America's Best Dance Crew, it was danced to on the Whack Track Challenge, given to the Ringmasters.

In July 2020, digital publication The Pudding carried out a study on the most iconic songs from the 1990s and songs that are most known by Millennials and the people of Generation Z. "Macarena" was the eighth song with the highest recognisability rate.

In a December 1, 1996 Peanuts comic strip, Snoopy is about to join Woodstock and a unnamed identical bird at a frozen-over birdbath for a hockey game, but they start off by doing the Macarena dance first before playing, much to his embarrassment.

Music video
The music video for the reworked Bayside Boys-remix of "Macarena" was directed by Vincent Calvet. It was choreographed and starred Mia Frye and features ten different women singing and dancing with Los del Río against a white background. In contrast to the scantily-clad women, Los del Río is dressed in suits.

Accolades

(*) indicates the list is unordered.

Charts
"Macarena"

Weekly charts

Year-end charts

"Macarena (Bayside Boys Mix)"

Weekly charts

Year-end charts

Decade-end charts

Certifications and sales

</ref>}}

"Macarena Christmas"
Critical reception
Pan-European magazine Music & Media wrote, "Just when you thought this was just a version of their worldwide smash with a couple of jingle bells added, this seasonal single erupts into a cheerful medley of Joy To The World, Jingle Bells and Silent Night. For all those who are looking for an uncomplicated Christmas."

Charts and certifications

Weekly charts

Year-end charts

Certifications

Los del Mar cover version

The song was covered by Canadian musical duo Los del Mar with vocals by Wil Veloz. It was first released in 1995. In their native Canada, this version was popular on MuchMusic and top 40 radio in 1995. It was reissued in 1996 in a new version with vocals from Pedro Castaño, which was also featured on their album Viva Evita (retitled Macarena: The Hit Album overseas). In Australia, this new version reached No. 2 on the ARIA Singles Chart, below the Bayside Boys' reworking of the original.

Critical reception
British magazine Music Week rated the song three out of five, writing, "Hot on the heels of RCA's release of the original version by Los Del Rio comes a second, lower-key version of the Spanish dance tune. Whoever wins the battle, the song is destined to become 1996's Lambada, loved and loathed in equal measure."

Music video
A music video was produced for the Los del Mar version. It shows Pedro Castano and his pet cat in an apartment getting ideas for the song's dance while watching people on television. By the next verse, more people dance outside to the song wherein Castano joins in and sings. Later on, a mob boss and his sidekicks pull up in a car and ask if they can join the dance. Excluding the outro segment, the video cuts around 40 seconds from the regular song.

Track listings

Will Veloz version
 Canadian CD single "Macarena"  – 3:49
 "Macarena"  – 5:02
 "Macarena"  – 6:38

 German CD single "Macarena" (Radio Mix) – 3:15
 "Macarena" (Mar Fe Mix) – 5:02
 "Macarena" (Ibiza House Mix) – 5:56
 "Macarena" (Bola Remix) – 6:38
 "Macarena" (Club Mix) – 5:18

 UK CD single "Macarena" (Radio Version) – 3:48
 "Macarena" (Mar Fe Mix) – 5:05
 "Macarena" (Gregorio Mix) – 7:01
 "Macarena" (Beat Foundation-Full Frontal Mix) – 6:21
 "Macarena" (Beat Foundation-Infinity Dub) – 6:46

Pedro Castaño version
 France CD single "Macarena" (Radio Mix) – 3:49
 "Macarena" (Bola Mix) – 6:08
 "Macarena" (Summer Mix '96) – 5:43
 "Macarena" (Mar Fe Mix) – 5:03

 France cardboard sleeve/Australian CD single "Macarena"  – 3:49
 "Macarena"  – 6:08

Charts and certifications

Weekly charts

Year-end charts

Certifications

Tyga cover version

On 13 November 2019, American rapper Tyga released a remix, rap version of the song, called "Ayy Macarena". J Balvin also sings the hook of the original song at the beginning of this version. This version has a more club-oriented sound. This version's official remix features Ozuna.

In addition to this, a music video premiered on Tyga's official YouTube channel on 17 December 2019, heavily inspired by the film The Mask. Los Del Rio also make a cameo appearance, performing the original chorus at the beginning of the video and making sparse appearances throughout.

Charts

Weekly charts

Year-end charts

Certifications

Other remixes, covers and parodies

MC Rage parody
MC Rage released the single "Fuck Macarena" in November 1996. It is a hardcore techno parody of Los del Río's "Macarena" and mocks the original version's lyrics, as do the dancers in the music video. MC Rage sings vulgar mocking lyrics as an outburst against the huge success of "Macarena". It peaked at No. 7 on the Dutch Top 40 on 27 December 1996, and at No. 8 on the Dutch Mega Top 100 on 25 January 1997. The song has a music video featuring gabber ravers dancing hakken.

The GrooveGrass Boyz version
In 1997, The GrooveGrass Boyz recorded a country music version of the "Macarena", with rewritten lyrics. This rendition peaked at No. 70 on the Hot Country Songs charts and No. 7 on the Bubbling Under Hot 100. This version was released on Imprint Records and sold over 80,000 copies.

Jay-5 version
Reggae and dancehall artist Jay-5 released the album "The Dancehall Macarena" on VP Records in 2015, featuring the song, 'Dancehall Macarena,' an upbeat fusion of dancehall moves, inspired by the infectious ’90s classic.

The single, 'Dancehall Macarena' is the first official Jamaican dancehall line dance. and gained over 1.6 million views on YouTube.

The success of "Dancehall Macarena" inspired a popular reggaeton version in 2016, "Dancehall Macarena Remix," by Colombian reggaeton artist, Japanese featuring Jay-5.

Gente de Zona version
In 2016, Cuban duo Gente de Zona teamed up with Los del Río released a new joint version of the song, with new lyrics.

Physics parody regarding the holographic principle
At the Strings 1998 conference in Santa Barbara about string theory, shortly after the publication of the paper "Anti De Sitter Space And Holography" by Edward Witten, Jeffrey A. Harvey composed a parody song "The Maldecena" about the Holographic principle.

ReferencesNotesCitations'

External links
 

1990s fads and trends
1993 debut singles
1993 songs
1995 singles
1996 singles
2019 singles
Billboard Hot 100 number-one singles
Dutch Top 40 number-one singles
European Hot 100 Singles number-one singles
Line dances
Macaronic songs
Novelty and fad dances
Novelty songs
Number-one singles in Australia
Number-one singles in Austria
Number-one singles in Denmark
Number-one singles in Finland
Number-one singles in Germany
Number-one singles in Greece
Number-one singles in Israel
Number-one singles in Spain
Number-one singles in Switzerland
SNEP Top Singles number-one singles
Songs about dancing
Songs about infidelity
Spanish-language songs
Tyga songs
Ultratop 50 Singles (Flanders) number-one singles
Ultratop 50 Singles (Wallonia) number-one singles